Louderback is a surname. Notable people with the surname include:

George Louderback (1874–1957), American geologist
Harold Louderback (1881–1941), American judge
Jim Louderback (born 1961), American businessman
Tom Louderback (1933–2020), American football player